When We Were Young is the debut release from Dusted. It was re-released in 2001.

Track listing
"Childhood —"  – 5:31
"Time Takes Time —"  – 5:41
"Want U —"  – 6:50
"Hurt U —"  – 1:45
"If You Go Down to the Woods —"  – 3:17
"Always Remember to Respect Your Mother, Pt. 1 —"  – 3:49
"The Biggest Fool in the World —"  – 6:47
"Oh, How Sweet —"  – 5:02
"Always Remember to Respect Your Mother, Pt. 2 —"  – 4:01
"Winter —"  – 4:33
"The Oscar Song —"  – 2:11
"Under the Sun —"  – 5:36
"If I Had a Child —"  – 3:31
"Always Remember to Respect and Honour Your Mother" (remix) – 6:35

2001 debut albums
Dusted (British band) albums
Albums produced by Rollo Armstrong